Meshtitsa is a village in southern Bulgaria. The village is located in Pernik Municipality, Pernik Province. Аccording to the numbers provided by the 2020 Bulgarian census, Ciuipetlovo currently has a population of 1003 people with a permanent address registration in the settlement.

Geography 
Meshtitsa is located 32 kilometers away from the capital of Bulgaria, Sofia, and 7 kilometers away from Pernik. River Konska passes near the village. The terrain near the village is plain and suitable for agricultural development. The village lies at an average elevation of 695 meters.

Culture and Infrastructure 
Every year there is a “Surva” festival that is held on the 13th of January in Meshtitsa village. It includes people dressing up with masks and folklore clothing in order to scare evil spirits away from the village as per tradition.

The people participating in the festival craft their own costumes and masks from animal horns and leather. Occasionally bird feathers are used to decorate the clothing.

Buildings and infrastructure 

 Community hall and library “P. K. Yavorov” was built in 1928.
 There is a kindergarten in the village.

Ethnicity 
According to the Bulgarian population census in 2011.

References 

Villages in Pernik Province